MacGibbon is a surname. Notable people with the surname include:

Brenda MacGibbon, Canadian mathematician, statistician, and decision scientist
Charlotte MacGibbon (born 1924), Australian javelin thrower
David MacGibbon (born 1934), Australian politician
David MacGibbon (1831–1902), Scottish architect
Harriet E. MacGibbon (1905–1987), American actor
Tony MacGibbon (1924–2010), New Zealand cricketer

See also
McGibbon